Juan Alberto Alonzo López (born 24 June 1911) was a Cuban footballer.

He represented Cuba at the 1938 FIFA World Cup in France. In his only match in the World Cup, Cuba lost to Sweden 0-8.

References

External links
 

1911 births
Year of death missing
Cuban footballers
Cuba international footballers
Association football forwards
1938 FIFA World Cup players